"Fröken Fräken" is a song written by Thore Skogman and recorded by Sven-Ingvars, who released it as a single in 1964. Their version charted at Svensktoppen for six weeks between 21 November 1964 and 9 January 1965, peaking at first position.

Thore Skogman recorded the song on 10 November 1963, and released it in December 1965 on the EP featuring Pop opp i topp.

The song also became successful outside Sweden, recordings in Danish, Finnish, Norwegian, French, English, Icelandic and Dutch as "Sophietje" med den folkkäre holländske artisten Johnny Lion.

In 2008, the song was performed at Dansbandskampen by Scotts, who included it on their 2008 album På vårt sätt 2008.

Charts

References

1964 singles
1964 songs
Sven-Ingvars songs
Scotts (band) songs
Songs written by Thore Skogman
Swedish-language songs